Julian Samuel "Juddy" Ash was a professional football player who played in the National Football League. He played only one year in the NFL, during the 1926 season for the Los Angeles Buccaneers.

References
PFRA Obituary Dates

1900 births
1965 deaths
Players of American football from San Francisco
Oregon State Beavers football players
Los Angeles Buccaneers players
People from Newport, Oregon